Mama Tata or Mama Chi (Mother Father) is a Christian syncretistic religion found in parts of Panama. It is a mixture of Catholicism and animism that has become popular among the Guaymí people. It began in the second half of the twentieth century, after prophetess Little Mama had a vision of Jesus riding up to her on a motorcycle.

Beliefs
Members of Mama Tata believe that God has abolished the Church and is now relating exclusively with the Guaymí through Little Mama who had a vision of Mary (Big Mama) and Jesus. Adherents believe that only Guaymí followers of this religion will go to heaven.

References

External links
 

Religion in Panama
Christian new religious movements
Christianity and religious syncretism
Guaymí people
Indigenous Christianity